Çaykur is a Turkish state owned tea producing company. Their portfolio includes ice tea, green tea, organic and black tea. Çaykur has 45 tea processing factories, and one packaging factory. The general manager of Çaykur is Yusuf Ziya Alim.

On 4 February 2017, all state owned stakes were handed over to the Turkey Wealth Fund.

The firm is a sponsor of Çaykur Rizespor football club.

References

External links 
 Official site

Companies established in 1983
Drink companies of Turkey
Tea brands
Tea companies
Turkish brands